The Baligród massacre occurred on Sunday, 6 August 1944 in Baligród, Lesko County (in the current Subcarpathian Voivodeship), Poland. Ukrainian nationalists with the Ukrainian Insurgent Army (UPA) entered the village of Baligród and killed 42 members of the Polish community.

The massacre
The UPA came from Stężnica and Huczwice, and surrounded the Polish population gathered in the church. When some people left the church, 42 people were murdered. The killings were in retaliation for the killing of 16 Ukrainians in Stężnica on 4 August 1944 in self-defense by citizens of Baligród and by Soviet partisans.

Another attack by the UPA in Baligrod was made a year later. On 1 August 1945 at around 22:00, a subunit of the Ukrainian Insurgent Army attacked the police station. Polish militiamen defended the station until 5:00 in the morning, with the result that the Ukrainians withdrew, but in revenge burned seven houses.

Sources
 Grzegorz Motyka, W kręgu "Łun w Bieszczadach", Warszawa 2009, 

1944 in Poland
Massacres in 1944
Anti-Polish sentiment in Europe
Massacres in Poland
World War II crimes in Poland
World War II massacres
Mass murder in 1944
August 1944 events
War crimes committed by the Ukrainian Insurgent Army